Whit Grant Fraser  (born November 26, 1942) is a Canadian journalist, broadcaster, and author who, thanks to his marriage to Mary Simon, is the 56th and current viceregal consort of Canada.

Background 
Born in Merigomish, Nova Scotia, and educated in Stellarton, Fraser began his career in journalism as a reporter for CKEC-FM in New Glasgow.

He joined CBC News in 1967 as a reporter in Frobisher Bay and later in Yellowknife. His coverage of the Mackenzie Valley Pipeline Inquiry in the late 1970s expanded his national prominence, following which he worked for a number of years as a national reporter based in Ottawa and Edmonton. In 1989 he was one of the final contenders to replace Peter Downie as host of the network's noon-hour newscast Midday, but was not selected; instead, he became host of This Country, a six-hour nightly program on the CBC's new all-news channel CBC Newsworld which covered regional news from across the country.

He left the CBC in 1991 when he was appointed by the federal government as chair of the Canadian Polar Commission, a new federal government agency devoted to territorial and Arctic issues. He briefly returned to television with the Inuit Broadcasting Corporation in 1999 as cohost with Jonah Kelly of the special broadcast covering the formal creation of Nunavut. He subsequently served as chief operating officer of Inuit Tapiriit Kanatami in the 2000s.

In 2018, he published True North Rising, a memoir of his work in Arctic communities.

In 2021, he was appointed an ex-officio Extraordinary Companion of the Order of Canada by Queen Elizabeth II – a customary appointment for all modern viceregal consorts – and gained the temporary courtesy style of Excellency upon his wife's assumption of office as governor general. He currently resides at Rideau Hall, the seat of the Canadian Crown.

In 2022, he published his second book, Cold Edge of Heaven, a historical fiction novel set in Dundas Harbour and based on some actual events.

References

External links 
 

20th-century Canadian journalists
21st-century Canadian journalists
21st-century Canadian non-fiction writers
21st-century Canadian male writers
Canadian radio reporters and correspondents
Canadian television reporters and correspondents
Canadian television news anchors
Canadian civil servants
Canadian memoirists
Canadian viceregal consorts
Journalists from Nova Scotia
People from Pictou County
Living people
CBC Television people
Canadian male non-fiction writers
Companions of the Order of Canada
1942 births